Venustoma lacunosa is a species of sea snail, a marine gastropod mollusk in the family Mangeliidae.

Description
The length of the shell varies between 5 mm and 8 mm.

The small shell has an broadly, ovate shape. The six whorls are ornamented by well developed, sigmoid axial ribs and almost equally strong spiral cords, the junction of which produce rounded tubercles The whorls of the blunt spire show a roundly sloping shoulder. The pear-shaped aperture measures half the total length and has a weak sinus at the shoulder of the outer lip. The incrassate outer lip has a smooth interior. The stout columella is slightly bent.

Distribution
This marine species occurs off Hong Kong and the Philippines

References

 Gould, 1860, Proceedings of the Boston Society of Natural History, vol. 7 (1859–1861), p. 338

External links
  R.I. Johnson, The Recent Mollusca of Augustus Addison Gould; United States National Museum, bulletin 239, Washington D.C. 1964
 
 Worldwide Mollusc Species Data Base : Venustoma lacunosa

lacunosa
Gastropods described in 1860